is the common name of the international Morse code distress signal.

SOS may also refer to:

Places
 Sos, Artsakh, Azerbaijan, a village in Khojavend District
 Sos, Lot-et-Garonne, France, a commune in southern France
 Sos del Rey Católico, Aragon, Spain, a town in Zaragoza Province

People
 Bill Sayer (1934-1989), an English rugby league player nicknamed Sos
 sOs (gamer), a StarCraft II esports player
 Shaun Marsh (born 1983), an Australian cricketer nicknamed SOS (Son of Swampy)
 Sós, a surname
 Stephen Silvagni (born 1967), an Australian football player nicknamed SOS

Arts, entertainment, and media

Films
 S.O.S. (1928 film), a 1928 British adventure film
 S.O.S. (1999 film), a 1999 Norwegian / Italian comedy film
 S.O.S. – En segelsällskapsresa, a 1988 Swedish comedy film
 Son of Sardaar, a 2012 Indian Hindi-language action-comedy film

Games
 SOS (arcade game), a 1979 shoot 'em up arcade game by Namco
 SOS (1993 video game), a 1993 SNES video game
 SOS: The Final Escape or Disaster Report, a 2002 PS2 video game
 SOS (game), a paper and pencil game

Literature
 "SOS" (short story), a 1933 short story by Agatha Christie
 Sos the Rope, a 1968 novel by Piers Anthony
 S.O.S. (novel), a 2001 novel by Joseph Connolly
 "SOS", a 2003 short story manga collection by Hinako Ashihara

Music

Groups and labels
 SOS (Indonesian group), an Indonesian girl group active from 2012–2016
 SOS (Turkish Cypriot band), a Turkish Cypriot rock band active since 1987
 SOS, a British band founded by Bernie Marsden
 Sisters of Shu, Dee Shu and Barbie Shu
 SOS Records, a punk rock record label
 Swing Out Sister, a UK band active since the 1980s
 Symphony of Soul, the band of Bowie State University in Maryland, US
 The S.O.S. Band, an American R&B and electro-funk band active since 1977

Albums
 S.O.S. (S.O.S. Band album), a 1980 album and debut of The S.O.S. Band
 S.O.S., a 1998 album by La Bouche, and its title song
 S.O.S (Morgana Lefay album), a 2000 album by Morgana Lefay
 SOS (SZA album), a 2022 album by SZA
 $O$, a 2010 album by Die Antwoord
 SOS (Millencolin album), a 2019 album by Millencolin

Songs
 "S.O.S. (Too Bad)", by Aerosmith, 1974
 "SOS" (ABBA song), 1975
 "S.O.S." (Pink Lady song), 1976
 "S.O.S." (ABC song), 1984
 "S.O.S" (Jonas Brothers song), 2007
 "S.O.S." (Ola song), 2007
 "S.O.S." by Stratovarius, from the album Destiny
 "S.O.S. (Let the Music Play)", by Jordin Sparks
 "S.O.S. (The Tiger Took My Family)", by Dr. Bombay (Jonny Jakobsen)
 "S.O.S.", by Collie Buddz from WWE The Music, Vol. 8
 "S.O.S.", by Jerry Cantrell from Degradation Trip Volumes 1 & 2
 "S.O.S.", by Chroma Key from Dead Air for Radios
 "S.O.S.", by Good Charlotte from The Chronicles of Life and Death
 "S.O.S.", by Gotthard from Firebirth
 "S.O.S.", by Earl Greyhound from Soft Targets
 "S.O.S." (Indila song), by Indila from Mini World
 "S.O.S.", La Bouche song
 "S.O.S.", by The Suicide Machines from their album Destruction by Definition
 "S.O.S. (Anything But Love)", by Apocalyptica from Worlds Collide
 "S.O.S.", by The Breeders from Last Splash
 "SOS" (Avicii song)
 "SOS" (Elena Patroklou song), 1991, Cypriot entry in the Eurovision Song Contest 1991
 "SOS" (Rihanna song), 2006
 "SOS", by Papa Roach from The Paramour Sessions
 "SOS", by Sekai no Owari
 "SOS", by Take That from their album Progress
 "Same Ol' Situation (S.O.S.)", by Mötley Crüe on the album Dr. Feelgood

Television
 S.O.S. (Agents of S.H.I.E.L.D.), a 2015 episode and season 2 finale
 "S.O.S. (Lost)", a 2006 episode of the second season
 S.O.S.: Sexo y otros secretos, a 2007 Mexican TV series
 "S.O.S", a segment of the 2017 Thai TV series Project S: The Series

Computing, and technology
 Apple SOS, an operating system
 Science On a Sphere, a display system
 Secure Our Smartphones, New York State and San Francisco initiative
 Sensor Observation Service, a standardized web service (OGC)
 Scrum of scrums, in software development
 SHARE Operating System, IBM
 Silicon on sapphire, a circuit-manufacturing process
 Son of sysreport, in Linux; see 
 Special ordered set, in optimization
 Structural operational semantics, in computer programming
 System of systems, in systems engineering

Food
 S.O.S. (appetizer), Swedish
 S.O.S., US military slang for chipped beef on toast

Government and military
 Secretary of state
 Services of Supply, a branch of the United States army
 Special Operations Squadron, United States Air Force units
 Squadron Officer School, a United States Air Force leadership school
 State Defense Guard (Czechoslovakia), Czechoslovakia, 1918–1936

Mathematics
 Polynomial SOS, decomposing into a sum of squares
 Sum of squares (disambiguation), in mathematics

Medicine and science
 Si opus sit, use medicine if needed
 Sinusoidal obstruction syndrome, a medical condition
 Son of Sevenless, a type of gene
 SOS response, a DNA repair system

Organizations
 Boat People SOS, a Vietnamese-American association
 Samaritans of Singapore, a suicide prevention centre
 Save Outdoor Sculpture!, a program of Heritage Preservation from 1989–1999
 Secular Organizations for Sobriety, an addiction recovery program
 Share Our Strength, a US hunger relief organization
 SOS Children's Villages, an organization that maintains housing and services for children without stable parental care
 SOS Sahel Ethiopia, a non-governmental organization in Ethiopia working on rural development
 Stop Our Ship (SOS), an antiwar movement during the Vietnam War

Sport
 Strength of schedule, a competitor rating statistic
 Survival of the Shawangunks, a triathlon held in New Paltz, New York

Other uses
 Södersjukhuset, a hospital in Stockholm, Sweden
 Somali shilling (ISO 4217 code: SOS), currency of Somalia
 SOS incident, several missing person incidents in Hokkaidō, Japan in the 1980s